Kwan Honk Wai (born February 24, 1953) is a Hong Kong sprint canoer who competed in the mid 1970s. He was eliminated in the repechages of the K-4 1000 m event at the 1976 Summer Olympics in Montreal, Quebec, Canada.

External links
Sports-Reference.com profile

1953 births
Canoeists at the 1976 Summer Olympics
Hong Kong male canoeists
Living people
Olympic canoeists of Hong Kong